Leonie Rebekka Maier (born 29 September 1992) is a German footballer. She currently plays as a defender for Everton and previously for the German national team.

Club career

VfL Sindelfingen, 2008–2010
Maier started her professional career with VfL Sindelfingen in the second tier of the Frauen-Bundesliga.  She spent two seasons at Sindelfingen. During her second season with Sindelfingen she scored 9 goals in 31 appearances with the club.

SC 07 Bad Neuenahr, 2010–2013
Maier then moved to SC 07 Bad Neuenahr, who played in the top tier of the Frauen-Bundesliga.  She stayed with the club for three seasons, playing 65 regular season games and scoring two goals.   Following the death of the club president, SC 07 Bad Neueahr filed for insolvency, forcing Maier to move.

Bayern Munich, 2013–2019
Maier signed for FC Bayern Munich.  Since joining the club she has won the Frauen-Bundesliga twice, in 2014–2015 and 2015–2016.  As of the end of the 2018–2019 season she has appeared in 92 first team regular season appearances, scoring four times.

Arsenal, 2019–2021
Maier signed for Arsenal FC on 31 May 2019. She made 25 appearances across two seasons.

Everton, 2021–
Maier signed for Everton in July 2021, with a two-year contract until the end of June 2023.

She scored her first goal for Everton on her debut in a 3–1 win vs. Birmingham City.

International career
Maier scored her first international goal in a friendly match against Canada on 19 July 2013. She scored in the 53rd minute, which resulted in a 1–0 win for Germany.

She has been selected for the squads of the 2015 FIFA Women's World Cup where Germany finished fourth, 2016 Summer Olympics, where Germany won the gold medal, the 2017 UEFA Women's Championship and the 2019 FIFA Women's World Cup.

She announced her international retirement in February 2023.

Career statistics

International

International goals
Scores and results list Germany's goal tally first:

Honours

Club
Bayern München
Bundesliga: Winner 2014–15, 2015–16

Germany
UEFA U-17 Women's Championship: Winner 2009
UEFA U-19 Women's Championship: Winner 2011
FIFA U-20 Women's World Cup: Runner-Up 2012
UEFA Women's Championship: Winner 2013
Summer Olympic Games: Gold medal, 2016
Algarve Cup: Winner 2014
FIFA U-17 Women's World Cup: Third place 2008

Individual
FIFPro: FIFA FIFPro World XI 2016

References

External links
 
 Profile at DFB 
 Player German domestic football stats at DFB 
 
 
 
 
 

1992 births
Living people
German women's footballers
German expatriate women's footballers
German expatriate sportspeople in England
Expatriate women's footballers in England
Germany women's international footballers
SC 07 Bad Neuenahr players
FC Bayern Munich (women) players
2015 FIFA Women's World Cup players
Footballers from Stuttgart
Women's association football defenders
Olympic gold medalists for Germany
Olympic medalists in football
Footballers at the 2016 Summer Olympics
Medalists at the 2016 Summer Olympics
Frauen-Bundesliga players
2. Frauen-Bundesliga players
Olympic footballers of Germany
UEFA Women's Championship-winning players
2019 FIFA Women's World Cup players
Arsenal W.F.C. players
Women's Super League players
UEFA Women's Euro 2017 players